Renfrewshire is one of the 32 council areas of Scotland (also known as local authorities or unitary authorities), formally established in 1996 to succeed the Renfrew district within the Strathclyde region, both of which were abolished; the headquarters are at Paisley.

The composition of the new bodies was decided in the Local Government etc. (Scotland) Act 1994 and elections were held nationwide in May 1995. Initially, councillors were elected via 40 individual wards each returning one member on a plurality (First-past-the-post) basis, which was the case in 1995, 1999 and 2003.

Under the Local Governance (Scotland) Act 2004, the election format was changed to a more proportional single transferable vote, with larger wards each electing three or four councillors (depending on population size), which in Renfrewshire resulted in the creation of 11 wards, still returning 40 councillors - the format used in the 2007 elections was repeated in 2012. A national review by Boundaries Scotland led to a re-arrangement in Renfrewshire, with three more councillors added, an additional new ward and adjustments for others, although some remained unchanged; this was put in place for the 2017 elections and used again in 2022 elections.

The current (post-2017) wards of Renfrewshire are summarised below (ordered as they are numbered by the council), with any changes since 2007 outlined (technically those which changed name and boundaries are new entities but in each case there is a clear continuity of members and territory).

Renfrew North and Braehead

As its name suggests, its territory covers the northern parts of Renfrew, the northern boundary being the River Clyde. Created in 2007 as Renfrew North with three representatives, the boundary review prior to the 2017 election resulted in a minor addition – streets north of Porterfield Road – which, in combination with the building of several residential developments surrounding the Braehead retail and leisure complex, increased the population sufficiently to merit a fourth councillor; the name was also amended to Renfrew North and Braehead. In 2020, the ward population was 17,827.

Councillors

Renfrew South and Gallowhill

Renfrew South and Gallowhill returns three councillors and has existed since 2007. As its name suggests, its territory covers the southern half of the town of Renfrew and north-eastern parts of the larger town of Paisley between the White Cart Water and the Inverclyde Line railway tracks, primarily the Gallowhill housing scheme; the 2017 re-configuration was minor, with streets north of Porterfield Road removed. In 2020, the ward population was 12,232.

Councillors

Paisley Northeast and Ralston
Created in 2007 as Paisley East and Ralston with four representatives and territory including the parts of eastern Paisley between the Inverclyde Line railway tracks to the north and Barrhead Road / Hurlet Road (the A726) to the south, plus much of the town centre up to the line of Storie Street, the 2017 boundary review led to a large part of its territory (south of Seedhill Road and the Paisley Canal line railway tracks, plus the town centre territory west of Mill Street) being combined with part of the Paisley South ward to form an additional entity, Paisley East and Central, the existing wards losing one seat each. The 2017 definition includes the Ralston and Oldhall neighbourhoods up to the local authority border with Glasgow, plus Barshaw, Whitehaugh and Williamsburgh further into Paisley on either side of the A761 Glasgow Road, where St Mirin's Cathedral and Paisley Grammar School are both situated. In 2020, the ward population was 12,810.

Councillors

Paisley Northwest

Paisley Northwest was created in 2007 and elects four councillors. As its name suggests, it covers the north-western areas of Paisley including part of the town centre (west of the line of Storie Street / Canal Terrace) and the Castlehead, Ferguslie Park, Gockston, Maxwellton, Millarston and Shortroods neighbourhoods. Coats Memorial Church, Glasgow International Airport, Paisley Museum and Art Galleries, Paisley Sheriff Court, the Royal Alexandra Hospital, St Mirren Park football stadium and the main campus of the University of the West of Scotland also lie within the ward, the north-eastern boundary of which is the White Cart Water, the southern boundary along the course of the old Paisley Canal line and Potterhill branch railway tracks, and the eastern boundary Calside / Stanely Road.

The 2017 boundary review led to the removal of some territory to the west of the course of the former Paisley and Barrhead District Railway tracks at Barskiven Road to the Johnstone South and Elderslie ward, but with only a small reduction in population as most of the developed land comprises the non-residential Phoenix Retail Park and St James Business Park. In 2020, the population was 17,018.

Councillors

Paisley East and Central
Paisley East and Central was created in 2017 as the result of the boundary review, in which it was decided to remove part of the territory and one seat each from the existing four-member wards of Paisley East and Ralston (between Seedhill Road / the Paisley Canal line railway tracks and the A726 Barrhead Road – primarily Blackhall and Seedhill – as well as most of the town centre between the Inverclyde Line railway tracks to the north, the line of Storie Street to the west and Mill Street to the east) and Paisley South (between Rowan Street / Dykebar Hospital and Barrhead Road, i.e. the Charleston, Dykebar, Hawkhead and Hunterhill neighbourhoods) and form an additional ward. Landmarks within the ward include Paisley Abbey, Paisley Town Hall and the Russell Institute. In 2020, its population was 12,218.

Councillors

Paisley Southeast

The ward was created as Paisley South in 2007 with four representatives and territory including almost all of south-eastern Paisley between Barrhead Road / Hurlet Road (the A726) to the north-east and Calside / Park Road / Stanely Road / Gleniffer Road (but not the Langcraigs neighbourhood) to the west. The 2017 boundary review led to part of its territory (between the A726 and Rowan Street / Dykebar Hospital, i.e. the Charleston, Dykebar, Hawkhead and Hunterhill neighbourhoods) being combined with part of the Paisley East and Ralston ward to form an additional entity, Paisley East and Central, the existing wards losing one seat each and being renamed. The 2017 definition of Paisley Southeast includes Carriagehill, Glenburn, Lochfield, Potterhill and Thornly Park; in 2020, the ward population was 12,925.

Councillors

Paisley Southwest

Paisley Southwest was created in 2007 and elects four councillors – it was unaffected by the 2017 boundary review.

As its name suggests, it covers the south-western areas of Paisley including Brediland, Durrockstock, Foxbar, Lounsdale, Meikleriggs and Stanely plus the Langcraigs neighbourhood (generally considered to be part of Glenburn), as well as most of the Gleniffer Braes Country Park on the high ground to the south of the town. Its northern boundary is along the course of the old Paisley Canal line and Potterhill branch railway tracks, and the eastern boundary along Stanely Road / Gleniffer Road to Glenburn Road, then east up to Langcraigs Drive; the south and west boundaries of the ward extend beyond the Paisley built-up area. In 2020, the population was 16,505.

Councillors

Johnstone South and Elderslie
Johnstone South and Elderslie elects four councillors and covers the southern half of the town of Johnstone including the neighbourhoods of Cochrane Castle, Corseford, Johnstone Castle, Quarrelton, Spateston and Thorn (the division being the Inverclyde Line railway tracks) and the adjacent village of Elderslie. When the ward was created in 2007 it was named Johnstone South, Elderslie and Howwood and included the village of Howwood, but the 2017 boundary review removed Howwood (and the rural hinterland up to the local authority boundaries with East Renfrewshire and North Ayrshire) and assigned it to the Johnstone North, Kilbarchan and Lochwinnoch ward, both entities being renamed accordingly. Some territory was gained from the Paisley Northwest ward, namely streets west of the course of the former Paisley and Barrhead District Railway tracks at Barskiven Road, though most of the developed land comprises the non-residential Phoenix Retail Park and St James Business Park. In 2020, the ward's population was 15,860.

Councillors

Johnstone North, Kilbarchan, Howwood and Lochwinnoch
The ward was created as Johnstone North, Kilbarchan and Lochwinnoch in 2007, electing three councillors and covering the northern half of the town of Johnstone (including the town centre and the Cartside neighbourhood, the division being the Inverclyde Line railway tracks) and the villages of Kilbarchan, and Lochwinnoch. Already consisting of a large rural hinterland up to the borders of North Ayrshire and Inverclyde local authorities to the west and north respectively, the boundary review in 2017 added the village of Howwood and its rural peripheries leading to East Renfrewshire from the existing Johnstone South, Elderslie and Howwood ward, both entities being renamed accordingly and Johnstone North gaining one further seat. In 2020, the Johnstone North, Kilbarchan, Howwood and Lochwinnoch ward's population was 14,740.

Councillors

Houston, Crosslee and Linwood

Created in 2007, its territory – which was unaffected by the boundary review in 2017 – takes in the adjoining villages of Crosslee (and Craigends) and Houston, and the nearby small town of Linwood, as well as Brookfield. In 2020, the Houston, Crosslee and Linwood ward's population was 19,152.

Councillors

Bishopton, Bridge of Weir and Langbank

Bishopton, Bridge of Weir and Langbank elects three councillors. Created in 2007, its territory – which was unaffected by the 2017 boundary review in 2017 – takes in the separate villages of Bishopton (including the modern development at Dargavel Village), Bridge of Weir and Langbank; its limitations include the border with Inverclyde local authority area to the west, the M8 and M898 motorways to the east, and the River Clyde to the north. In 2020, the ward's population was 10,040.

Councillors

Erskine and Inchinnan

Erskine and Inchinnan elects four councillors. Created in 2007, its territory – which was unaffected by the boundary review in 2017 – contains the town of Erskine and adjacent village of Inchinnan; its limitations include the M8 and M898 motorways to the west, the River Clyde to the north, the River Cart to the east and its tributary the Black Cart Water to the south. In 2020, the ward's population was 18,063.

Councillors

References

External links

Politics of Renfrewshire
Renfrewshire
2007 establishments in Scotland